Bjarne Kortgaard Ingebretsen (born 10 October 1987) is a Norwegian football midfielder and assistant coach for Mjøndalen.

He joined Lyn from Mjøndalen IF in 2002, and made his Norwegian Premier League debut on 13 July 2004 against Viking FK. He stayed in Lyn for four seasons, but never broke into the first team. He was loaned out to Kongsvinger IL in 2007 and Nybergsund IL in 2008. Ahead of the 2009 season the move to Nybergsund IL was made permanent. He joined Mjøndalen in 2011, but retired due to injuries in 2014. However, he made a comeback in the following season, playing in a first round cup match for the same club.

In January 2015, he became assistant coach for Mjøndalen.

Career statistics

References

1987 births
Living people
People from Nedre Eiker
Norwegian footballers
Lyn Fotball players
Kongsvinger IL Toppfotball players
Nybergsund IL players
Mjøndalen IF players
Eliteserien players
Association football midfielders
Sportspeople from Viken (county)